Iskar may refer to:

Bulgaria
 Iskar (river), a river in western Bulgaria
 Iskar Reservoir, situated on the Iskar River 
 Iskar (town), a town in the Iskar Municipality of the Pleven Province
 Iskar Municipality
 Iskar, Sofia, one of 24 municipalities in the Bulgaria's Sofia (city) province
 Iskar, Varna Province, a village in the Valchi Dol Municipality of Varna Province
 Iskar–Panega Geopark
 Iskar Stadium, Samokov, Sofia Province
 Iskar Gorge
Afghanistan
 Iskar, Afghanistan
Antarctica
 Iskar Glacier, Livingston Island, Antarctica

See also
 Iskra (disambiguation)
 Iscah, daughter of Haran in the Book of Genesis